George Charles Whitcombe (21 January 1902 – 30 April 1986) was a Welsh footballer. He also captained Wales at baseball, winning a total of five caps.

A product of the Welsh club, Bargoed, He was then discovered by the club of his native town, Cardiff City in 1922, before he was sold on to Stockport County in 1925. In August 1926, he moved on to Port Vale. He would remain at the club for five years, playing 55 games, as the club topped the Third Division North in 1929–30. On 27 June 1928 George took a break from football to marry Gwendoline Thomas in Grangetown, Cardiff. He was then sold on to Notts County in December 1930, a club that won the Third Division South title in 1930–31. He later turned out for non-league sides Ashton National Gas and Colwyn Bay. After retiring, he became a publican.

He was part of a famous sporting family; his brother Frank represented Great Britain and Wales at rugby league, his nephew Frank Whitcombe Jr played rugby union for Bradford RFC and Yorkshire, and his great-nephew Martin Whitcombe played rugby union for Leicester Tigers and England Saxons.

Football career
A "dogged, hard working" right-half, who could also play at centre-half, Whitcombe began his football career with local side Grange Albion in 1921. In summer 1922, Whitcombe signed for First Division Cardiff City. He spent three years at Ninian Park, during which time, in 1923–24, the "Bluebirds" finished second in the Football League. However following the Welsh Senior Cup tie with Swansea City on 2 March 1925, which Cardiff lost 4–0, he was sold on to Stockport County of the Second Division.

The "Hatters" were relegated in last place in 1925–26, and Whitcombe left the club due to a dispute over wages. In total he played fifteen times for County, before joining Port Vale back in the Second Division in August 1926.

He made his Port Vale debut in a 3–1 home win against Southampton on 27 September. He later appeared for the "Valiants" in the FA Cup Fourth Round clash with Arsenal, which ended in a 1–0 defeat at Highbury, following a 2–2 draw at The Old Recreation Ground. The "Gunners" went on to the final, only to be beaten by Cardiff City. Whitcombe finished the 1926–27 campaign with 24 appearances to his name. He played fourteen games in 1927–28, and appeared twelve times in 1928–29, as the club were relegated into the Third Division North. Following the death of manager Joe Schofield, Vale won promotion as the division's champions under Tom Morgan in 1929–30; however Whitcombe made just the one appearance throughout the season. Despite only playing a further three games in 1930–31, he was sold to Notts County for a 'substantial amount' in December 1930, having played a total of 55 matches for the club (51 in the league).

He made only seven appearances for Notts County, having been sent off, for the only time in his career, in a county cup game against Frickley Colliery, and hit with a monthlong suspension as punishment. Despite this, the "Magpies" topped the Third Division South table by the end of the season.

Whitcombe returned to Cardiff, though his playing days were not quite over. He moved to be player-coach to a works team in Ashton-under-Lyne called Ashton National Gas, before ending his football career at Colwyn Bay.

Baseball career

Grange Albion
In the summer months George played baseball for Grange Albion one of the longest standing and most successful clubs in Wales. The club has produced 52 players who have been capped by Wales and no less than 13 Welsh international captains, including George Whitcombe.

During George's time at Grange Albion the club enjoyed great success winning the Welsh Baseball Union Cup in 1921–22,1923–24 & 1931–32. The club backed the cup success up by winning the Welsh League Championship, the (Dewar Shield) in 1921–22, 1923–24, 1925–26, 1929–30 & 1931–32. After his retirement from Baseball George Whitcombe became a life member of Grange Albion Baseball Club

Welsh International

George Whitcombe won a total of five caps for Wales, all against England. His first cap came at the Cardiff Arms Park Cricket Ground on 2 August 1926, when he fielded at 1st Base and opened the Welsh batting; he made 4 out of 94, and England scored 47 and 43. His second cap came at The Police Athletic Ground (Liverpool) on 30 July 1927, when he batted 6th, scoring 1 and 2; Wales made 48 and 83, England made 41 and 27. He won his third cap on 20 July 1929, at the same ground in Liverpool; he scored 2 and 2 batting second out of 83 and 52 for 5, England made 71 and 62.

He captained Wales at The Old Recreation Ground (home of his then football team Port Vale F.C.) in an international match on 17 May 1930; Wales made 45 and 70, England made 59 and 27. Whitcombe's fourth cap came at The Police Athletic Ground on 11 July 1931, where Wales won 46 and 41 against England's 36 and 17; batting 11th he scored 6 and 1. His final cap came on 1 July 1933, again at The Police Athletic Ground; he batted first scoring 0 and 13 out of 33 and 55, but England won with 48 and 43 for 3. Whitcombe's time in the Welsh team was when the sport was at it strongest in both Wales and England.

Post-retirement

At the end of his football career, Whitcombe returned to Cardiff and firstly ran the "Lord Windsor Hotel" in Grangetown, and later "The Ninian Park Hotel" in Leckwith near to Cardiff City's home ground. He then ran the "Coldstream Hotel" at Riverside just outside Cardiff city centre for a twenty-seven-year period between 1937 and 1964.

Whitcombe served in the Home Guard during World War II.

Family
He was one of ten children growing up at 52 Wedmore Road in Grangetown. His father, Frederick William Whitcombe, was a prize fighter in bare-knuckle boxing at Cardiff Docks, known locally as Tiger Bay.

He attended Ninian Park Council School in Cardiff, along with his brother Frank. Frank played rugby league for Bradford Northern, and also represented Great Britain. Another brother, Teddy, played baseball for Grange Albion. His nephew, Frank Whitcombe Jr, played rugby union for Bradford RFC and Yorkshire. Another nephew, Brian Whitcombe, was a back row forward for Bradford RFC.

He was also the great uncle of Martin Whitcombe, who was a prop for the rugby union side Leicester Tigers, and England 'B',

The city of Cardiff celebrated the sporting achievements of eight "local sporting heroes" as part of the city's celebrations as European Capital of Sport 2014. George Whitcombe along with his brother Frank were two of them. An event was held in their home town at Grangetown, in the local library, on 8 April 2014 where their sporting achievements were recognized.

Career statistics
Source:

Honours
Port Vale
Football League Third Division North: 1929–30

Notts County
Football League Third Division South: 1930–31

References

People from Grangetown, Cardiff
Footballers from Cardiff
Welsh footballers
Association football midfielders
Cardiff City F.C. players
Stockport County F.C. players
Port Vale F.C. players
Notts County F.C. players
Ashton National F.C. players
Colwyn Bay F.C. players
English Football League players
Association football coaches
Players of British baseball
British Home Guard soldiers
British publicans
1902 births
1986 deaths